Urbano may refer to:
 Urbano (album), a 2002 album by Elvis Crespo
 Urbano music, an umbrella term for certain genres of Latin music

People with the given name
 Urbano José Allgayer (born 1924), Brazilian prelate of the Roman Catholic Church
 Urbano Santos da Costa Araújo (1859–1922), Brazilian politician
 Urbano Antillón (born 1982), Mexican-American professional boxer in the Lightweight division
 Urbano Barberini (1664–1722), Italian nobleman of the House of Barberini
 Urbano Barberini (born 1961), Italian actor
 Urbano Caldeira (1890–1933), athlete, coach, and manager of the Santos Futebol Clube
 Urbano Cairo (born 1957), Italian businessman and chairman of Torino Football Club
 Urbano Navarrete Cortés (1920–2010), Italian professor of Canon Law
 Urbano Lazzaro (1924–2006), Italian resistance fighter who played an important role in capturing Benito Mussolini
 Urbano Lugo (born 1962), former pitcher for Major League Baseball from  Venezuela
 Urbano Ortega (born 1961), retired Spanish footballer
 Urbano Rattazzi (1808–1873), Italian statesman
 Urbano Rivera (born 1926), football midfielder who played for Uruguay
 Urbano Romanelli (1645-1682), Italian painter of the Baroque period
 Urbano González Serrano (1848–1904), Spanish philosopher, psychologist, and educator
 Urbano Tavares Rodrigues (1923–2013), Portuguese writer and professor of literature

People with the surname
 Carl Urbano (1910–2003), American director at Hanna-Barbera Productions
 João Urbano (born 1985), Portuguese racing driver
 José Urbano (born 1966),  retired race walker from Portugal
 Manuel Urbano or Manuel Conde (1915–1985), Filipino actor
 Matías Urbano (born 1981), Argentine footballer who plays for Millonarios in the Colombian Categoría Primera A
 Michael Urbano (born 1960), American musician
 Orlando Urbano (born 1984), Italian football (soccer) player
 Pietro Urbano, Italian artist of the Renaissance period
 Umberto Urbano (1885–1969), Italian baritone opera singer

Fictional
 Frank Urbano, a character played by Antoni Corone on Oz

See also
 Urban (disambiguation)